Dolné Mladonice is a village and municipality in the Krupina District of the Banská Bystrica Region of Slovakia.

History
In historical records, the village was first mentioned in 1391 (Legyend),  when it belonged to Bzovík Castle.

Genealogical resources

The records for genealogical research are available at the state archive "Statny Archiv in Banska Bystrica, Slovakia"

 Roman Catholic church records (births/marriages/deaths): 1686-1895 (parish B)
 Lutheran church records (births/marriages/deaths): 1757-1873 (parish B)

See also
 List of municipalities and towns in Slovakia

References

External links
 
 
https://web.archive.org/web/20080111223415/http://www.statistics.sk/mosmis/eng/run.html.  
http://www.e-obce.sk/obec/dolnemladonice/dolne-mladonice.html
Surnames of living people in Dolne Mladonice

Villages and municipalities in Krupina District